Ethmia baihua is a moth in the family Depressariidae. It was described by Yang in 1977. It is found in northern China.

References

Moths described in 1977
baihua